Andamooka Station is a pastoral lease that once operated as a sheep station but now operates as a cattle station in outback South Australia.

Description
The station is bounded to the east by the ephemeral salt lake, Lake Torrens. It is bounded to the south by Arcoona Station and to the north by Stuart Creek and Mulgaria Station. Both Roxby Downs Station and Purple Downs abut the western boundary.

The landscape is composed mostly of Arcoona tablelands vegetated with saltbush and bluebush. It is currently stocked with cattle.

BHP's Olympic Dam mine and processing plant is found in the north west of the station. The company also holds the lease for three other properties the surround the operations; Roxby Downs, Purple Downs and Stuart Creek Stations.

History
The traditional owners of the area are the Kuyani people, an Aboriginal Australian people. The name "Andamooka" is a combination of two of words in the Kuyani language meaning "loaded bone" or "powerful bone", which is a reference to bone pointing as an act of retribution.

The first European to visit was John McDouall Stuart, who passed through the area in 1858 and made note of a waterhole in the area.

The station was established in 1872. In 1880 the property was owned by Messrs Bowman and Young and was running sheep. The men had sunk several wells and also acquired a  block of land for £3.000 from M. Wooldridge of Arcoona Station to enlarge the run, which was stocked with 17,000 sheep and was having a shearing shed erected. By 1884 the  property was stocked with 45,000 sheep, 900 cattle and 250 horses. It produced 480 bales of wool from the year's clip. The same year 680 bales of wool were produced. By 1893 the property was owned by Messrs Beaton and Young.

Opals were discovered on the property in 1930 by two drovers who saw the flashes of colour reflected from opals embedded in a hillside after a thunderstorm. The town site of Andamooka was established shortly afterwards.

Dingos had become problematic in the area and were killing stock.

The land occupying the extent of the Andamooka Station pastoral lease was gazetted by the Government of South Australia as a locality in April 2013 under the name "Andamooka Station".

See also
List of ranches and stations

References

Stations (Australian agriculture)
Pastoral leases in South Australia
Far North (South Australia)
1872 establishments in Australia